Indus International University (IIU) is a private not-for-profit university, located near the village Bathu in Haroli Tehsil, Una district, Himachal Pradesh, India. The university was established in 2010 by the Kartha Education Society through the Indus International University (Establishment & Regulation) Act, 2009.

Schools and departments
The university comprises three schools:
 School of Engineering and Technology
 Computer Science Engineering
 Department of Civil Engineering
 Department of Mechanical Engineering
School of Sciences and Humanities
Department of Mathematics
Department of Physics
Department of Chemistry
Department of English
School of Business and Management
 Department of Business and Management
 Department of Hospitality and Tourism Management

Approval
Like all universities in India, Indus International University is recognised by the University Grants Commission (UGC), which has also sent an expert committee and accepted compliance of observation/deficiencies.

References

External links

Education in Una district
Universities in Himachal Pradesh
Educational institutions established in 2010
2010 establishments in Himachal Pradesh
Private universities in India